Stomp the Yard: Homecoming is a 2010 American dance drama film directed by Rob Hardy. It is the sequel to 2007's Stomp the Yard. The film is released in direct-to-video on September 21, 2010. Cast members include Collins Pennie, Pooch Hall, Tika Sumpter, Stephen "tWitch" Boss, Terrence J, Kiely Williams, Jasmine Guy, David Banner, Keith David, Teyana Taylor  and a cameo from Columbus Short as DJ Williams, the "stepping veteran" of Theta Nu Theta.

Premise
Chance Harris looks to find a balance between his school, work, relationships and opportunity to perform at the nationally televised step competition during homecoming weekend at Truth University.

Cast
 Collins Pennie as Chance Harris
 Columbus Short as DJ Williams
 Pooch Hall as Dane
 Joshua Walker as Joe
 Tika Sumpter as Nikki
 Stephen "tWitch" Boss as Taz
 Terrence J as Ty
 Kiely Williams as Brenda
 Jasmine Guy as Janice
 David Banner as Jay
 Keith David as Terry Harris
 Teyana Taylor as Rena
 Teairra Monroe as Brooke
 Lamar Stewart as Wynn
 Tyler Nelson as Bryce
 Babbal Kumar as dark dancer
 Terrence Polite as Roy
 Rickey Smiley as Finale MC
 George "Gee" Alexander as Craig "C-Killa"
 Montrel Miller as Mu Gamma Zi Brother #2

Production notes
Filming began in Atlanta in November 2009.

Soundtrack
The 14 tracks used in the film are:
 Ace Hood - Don't Get Caught Slippin'
 Get Cool - Go (Time To Get)
 John-John - Bounce
 Jasper Sawyer - Evil
 Mr. Robotic - We Got 'Em
 Classic - Here To Party
 G-Side - College Chicks
 Short Dawg - Get Ya Money Up
 John Forté - Nervous
 Rae ft. Basko & Nomadik - Third Degree
 Will Wreck ft. Clout Cartel - Rock Yo Body
 Get Cool - I'm Grown
 B Double E - To The Top
 Todd Bozung - Stomp Score Suite
 Roscoe Dash - Show Out

References

External links
 
 

2010 films
African-American musical drama films
American dance films
2010s musical drama films
Direct-to-video sequel films
Films shot in Georgia (U.S. state)
Films about fraternities and sororities
2010s hip hop films
Films produced by Will Packer
Rainforest Films films
Stage 6 Films films
2010 drama films
2010s English-language films
2010s American films
African-American films